Réjane Laberge-Colas  (8 October 19239 August 2009) was a judge of the Quebec Superior Court, sitting in Montreal, and the first woman to serve as a superior court judge in Canada. She was a founder and the first president of the Fédération des femmes du Québec (FFQ). Laberge-Colas was inducted to the Order of Canada in 1997.

Legal career 
After placing first in the 1952 Quebec bar exam, Laberge-Colas began her career as in-house counsel to Aluminium Secretariat Ltd, an affiliate of what is now Alcan. In 1957, she took a position as an articling student at Geoffrion et Prud'homme, a corporate law firm. She was named a Queen's Counsel in 1968.

Laberge-Colas practised at Geoffrion et Prud'homme until 1969, when she was appointed to the bench. She served as a judge of the Quebec Superior Court until 1994.

Activism 
In the mid-1960s, Laberge-Colas was a member of the Ligue des droits de l'homme du Quebec (Quebec Human Rights League), an organization which advocated for the Quebec Charter of Human Rights and Freedoms.

Along with Thérèse Casgrain and Monique Bégin, Laberge-Colas founded the Fédération des femmes du Québec (FFQ) in Montreal during a conference that ran from 23 to 24 April 1966. At the conference, Laberge-Colas was named the FFQ's first president. A number of members of the Ligue were also members of FFQ.

Personal life
Laberge-Colas was born in Montreal to Xiste Laberge and Isabelle Lefebvre. She married Émile Colas, a lawyer, in 1958.

Works

Notes

References

Bibliography 
 

1923 births
2009 deaths
Canadian women lawyers
Canadian women judges
Judges in Quebec
Lawyers from Montreal
Burials at Notre Dame des Neiges Cemetery
20th-century women lawyers